Valentijn Bing (22 April 1812, Amsterdam - 28 January 1895, Nieuwpoort) was a Dutch painter, illustrator, and lithographer. His works included genre scenes, religious art, portraits, and cityscapes.

Life and work 
He was the son of Andreas Christoph Bing, a merchant, and his English wife, Mary Ann née Barton.

He made his entry into the art world by participating in the Exhibition of Living Masters. In 1839, he became a member of Arti et Amicitiae. From 1843, he was a teacher at the Akademie. His most familiar students include Jacques Carabain,  Jan Portielje, and Marie Wandscheer.

Together with his fellow lithographer, he wrote and illustrated Nederlandsche kleederdragten, naar de natuur geteekend (1857), on the traditional costumes of the Netherlands. They also produced two instructional books on drawing, in 1863 and 1866.    

He remained unmarried and lived with his sisters in Amsterdam, until he was fifty-one. That year, he married Antonia Johanna Heiligers (1835-1897), from Bleskensgraaf, who was thirteen years his junior. They had several children. In 1891, they moved to Bleskensgraaf, but stayed there for only a short time, then moved to Nieuwpoort, where he died, aged eighty-two.

References

Further reading
 "Bing, Valentin". In: Hermann Alexander Müller: Biographisches Künstler-Lexikon. Verlag des Bibliographischen Instituts, Leipzig 1882, pg.52
 "Bing, Valentin", In: Allgemeines Lexikon der Bildenden Künstler von der Antike bis zur Gegenwart, Vol. 4: Bida–Brevoort, Wilhelm Engelmann, Leipzig 1910 (Online)
 "Bing, Valentijn", In: Pieter A. Scheen: Lexicon Nederlandse beeldende kunstenaars, 1750–1880. Den Haag 1981, S. 43 f.

External links

 Entry on Valentijn Bing @ the ARTindex Lexicon
 More works by Bing @ ArtNet

1812 births
1895 deaths
Dutch painters
Dutch illustrators
Dutch lithographers
Dutch genre painters
Painters from Amsterdam